Vincent Millet (born 12 October 1973 in Tarbes, Hautes-Pyrénées, France) is a retired French alpine skier who competed in the men's giant slalom at the 2002 Winter Olympics.

External links
 sports-reference.com
 

1973 births
Living people
French male alpine skiers
Olympic alpine skiers of France
Alpine skiers at the 2002 Winter Olympics
Sportspeople from Tarbes
21st-century French people